Sir Alan Stanley Collins, KCVO, CMG (born 1 April 1948), is a retired British diplomat and former Consul General in New York City (2007–11), High Commissioner to Singapore (2003–07) and Ambassador to the Philippines (1998–2002).

Collins joined the Foreign and Commonwealth Office in 1981 as a Desk Office after working in the Ministry of Defence for around 11 years. He had served in a number of diplomatic positions in Ethiopia and the Philippines before he became Head of Aviation and Maritime Department in 1993. From 1995 to 1998, he was Director-General of the British Trade and Cultural Office in Taipei (predecessor of the British Office Taipei). Between 2002 and 2003, he was seconded to Royal Dutch Shell as Vice-President for International Relations.

Collins took a keen interest in the welfare of children when he was Ambassador to the Philippines. As High Commissioner to Singapore, he took part in arranging Queen Elizabeth II's third state visit to that country in 2006, for which he was made a Knight Commander of the Royal Victorian Order. In Singapore, he also served in the delegation that won the 2012 Olympics for London. In 2011, he was further associated with the preparation of the Olympic Games when he was appointed Managing Director of Olympic Legacy under the UK Trade & Investment.

After retiring from the diplomatic service in 2011, Collins has held a number of directorships, including those of Prudential Assurance Singapore, ICICI Bank UK and JP Morgan American Investment Trust, etc. He has been Director-General of the Commonwealth Business Council since 2012.

Biography

Early years 
Collins was born in London, the United Kingdom, on 1 April 1948. He is the son of Stanley Arthur Collins and Rose Elizabeth Gimble. He was educated at Strand Grammar School before entering the London School of Economics, where he studied international relations and obtained a Bachelor of Science degree in economics. In 1970, he joined the Ministry of Defence (MoD), serving in junior positions including those related to personnel, resource management, defence policy and the North Atlantic Treaty Organization.  Between 1973 and 1975, he was Private Secretary to the Vice Chief of the Air Staff.

Career diplomat 
In 1981, Collins left the MoD to join the Foreign and Commonwealth Office (FCO). His first position was a Desk Officer for the Nordic countries in the Western European Department. Two years later, he became a Desk Officer for Iran and Iraq in the Middle East Department. Between 1986 and 1990, he was posted to the British Embassy in Addis Ababa, Ethiopia, where he worked as First Secretary, Head of Chancery and Deputy Head of Mission successively. In 1990, he was posted to the British Embassy in Manila, the Philippines, where he was Counsellor (Commercial) and Deputy Head of Mission. He returned to the United Kingdom as Head of Aviation and Maritime Department in 1993.

In 1995, Collins was selected, among a pool of five to six fellow diplomats, to succeed Philip Morrice, who was to become Consul General in Sydney, Australia, as Director-General of the British Trade and Cultural Office in Taipei, Taiwan (i.e. the Republic of China). Since Taiwan and the United Kingdom did not have formal diplomatic relations, the Office functioned as a de facto embassy to represent British interests in Taiwan.  After he took office in August 1995, Collins proactively fostered economic and cultural ties between the two countries. During his tenure, United Kingdom-Taiwan bilateral trade reached 5 billion United States dollars (USD), in which US$2 billion was British investment in Taiwan, while the number of Taiwanese visiting the United Kingdom increased to 14,000. In recognition of his diplomatic work in Taiwan, he was appointed a Companion of the Order of St Michael and St George in the 1998 New Year Honours list.

From 1998 to 2002, Collins was appointed Ambassador to the Philippines, where he got involved in a number of livelihood projects and paid particular attention to children welfare. He worked with Save the Children, a United Kingdom-based non-governmental organisation, to provide medical services to children by setting up mobile clinics on the streets of the Malate district in Manila. He also assisted in organising training on handling child abuse cases for the Philippine National Police.

In 2002, Collins was seconded to Royal Dutch Shell as Vice-President for International Relations, responsible for the company's global relationships with governments. Upon returning to the FCO in 2003, he was appointed High Commissioner to Singapore, where he took part in arranging Queen Elizabeth II's third state visit to Singapore in 2006. For that he was appointed a Knight Commander of the Royal Victorian Order. When he was in Singapore, he also served in the delegation that won the 2012 Olympics for London.

In September 2006, it was announced that Collins would take up the dual position of Consul General in New York and Director-General of Trade and Investment in the United States.  Having assumed the dual capacity in January 2007, he oversaw a team of 250 staff members in the United States and in London and he was responsible for strengthening bilateral relationships between the United Kingdom and New York City, promoting British export interests in the United States and attracting high-value inward investment to the United Kingdom. In 2009, he also supported Prince Harry's official visit to New York City.

In New York, Collins continued to be associated with the preparatory work of the 2012 Olympic Games. In 2011, he was appointed the Senior Responsible Officer of the London Olympics 2012 Co-ordination Unit to oversee the FCO's contribution to the Games. He was also Managing Director of Olympic Legacy under the UK Trade & Investment (UKTI) to take in charge of the strategic direction of London 2012 work in the FCO and the UKTI. Collins retired from the FCO in 2011 after serving four years as Consul General in New York, but he continued to hold the offices related to the Olympic Games until 2012.

Post-FCO career 
After retiring from the FCO, Collins has held a number of directorships. He is a non-executive director of Prudential Assurance Singapore, ICICI Bank UK and JP Morgan American Investment Trust, as well as a director of Prudential Hong Kong.  Since 2012, he has been Director-General of the Commonwealth Business Council.

Personal life 
Collins was married to Ann Dorothy Roberts in 1971. The couple have one daughter and two sons. Their daughter was born in 1985 and their two sons were born in 1988 and 1995 respectively. Collins is a member of Marylebone Cricket Club and the Royal Commonwealth Society. His hobbies include sports, antiques, reading and walking. He is also a supporter of British arts and culture and the Life Patron of the British Theatre Playhouse, a Singaporean theatre and live entertainment company.

Honours 
 Companion of the Order of St Michael and St George (New Year Honours List 1998)
 Knight Commander of the Royal Victorian Order (13 March 2006)
 Freeman of the City of London

See also 
 2012 Summer Olympics
 British Office Taipei
 Save the Children

Footnotes

References

English materials 
 Diaz, Natalia F., "Her Majesty's Man in Manila", Sunday Inquirer Magazine, 24 March 2002. 
 "Ministry of Foreign Affairs Press Statement", Singapore Government Press Release, 28 January 2003. 
 "Change of Her Majesty's British Consul-General in New York", Government News, 29 September 2006. 
 "Prince Harry to visit New York City", The Royal Family, 13 May 2009. 
 "FCO Public Diplomacy: The Olympic and Paralympic games 2012 – Foreign Affairs Committee", The Parliament of the United Kingdom, 6 February 2011. 
 "Sir Alan Collins appointed to the Amlin plc Board", Amlin, 29 September 2011. 
 "COLLINS, Sir Alan (Stanley)". Who's Who 2013. London: A. & C. Black. 2012. 
 Briggs, Fiona, "Commonwealth Business Council appoints new director general", Retail Times, 1 February 2012. 
 "Board Members", ICICI Bank United Kingdom, retrieved on 1 April 2016. 
 "Advisory Council", London Philharmonic Orchestra, retrieved on 8 April 2016. 
 "Births Jun 1948: Collins, Alan S.", FreeBMD, retrieved on 10 July 2016.

Chinese materials 
 "英駐華代表下月易人牟理士調識、外交部司長柯林斯接任", United Daily News, 26 March 1995, p. 2.
 "英國新任駐華代表六日抵台履新。柯安龍：推廣經貿交流與兩岸情勢無關", United Daily News, 3 August 1995, p. 4.
 "致力推動中英雙邊貿易投資，英國貿易文化台北辦事處處長柯安龍獨領C.M.G.獎", Economy Daily News, 2 February 1998, p. 32.

External links 

 UK and Taiwan
 British Embassy Manila
 British High Commission Singapore
 British Consulate General New York
 A Directory of British Diplomats

1948 births
Living people
Civil servants in the Ministry of Defence (United Kingdom)
Ambassadors of the United Kingdom to the Philippines
High Commissioners of the United Kingdom to Singapore
Representatives of the United Kingdom to Taiwan
British businesspeople
Knights Commander of the Royal Victorian Order
Companions of the Order of St Michael and St George
Alumni of the London School of Economics
People educated at the Strand School